Alexandre Péclier is a French rugby union player who currently plays for the French club of CS Bourgoin-Jallieu. He earned his first cap for the France national team on July 3, 2004 against the United States. He has won the European Shield in 1997 with Bourgoin, where he played during 10 seasons.

External links 
 Profile from lequipe.fr 
 Profile from ercrugby.com 

1975 births
Living people
Sportspeople from Villefranche-sur-Saône
French rugby union players
France international rugby union players
Rugby union fly-halves
Rugby union fullbacks
ASM Clermont Auvergne players
CS Bourgoin-Jallieu players
French rugby union coaches
Lyon OU players
CA Brive players